Randall Keith Filer (born January 14, 1952) is an American economist. Dr. Filer is a professor of economics at Hunter College and the Graduate Center  of the City University of New York and a Visiting Professor of Economics and Senior Scholar at CERGE-EI. He is President of the CERGE-EI Foundation, a US-based nonprofit that supports economic education in the post-communist countries of Central and Eastern Europe. Professor Filer serves as the Eastern European Coordinator of the Global Development Network (GDN), and is a member (past Chair) of the International Faculty Committee at the International School of Economics in Tbilisi (ISET) in Tbilisi, Georgia. He is a research Fellow of the Institute for the Study of Labor (IZA) in Bonn,  CESifo (Munich),  the William Davidson Institute (Ann Arbor)  and the Manhattan Institute (NYC).

Professor Filer received his Ph.D. from Princeton University in 1979 where he was affiliated with the Industrial Relations Section and the Office of Population Research. He graduated magna cum laude with Highest Honors in economics from Haverford College. His research has been supported by the National Science Foundation, the ACE program of the European Union, the Alfred P. Sloan Foundation, the Volkswagen Foundation, and the National Endowment for the Arts, among others and has appeared in leading professional journals including The American Economic Review, The Journal of Political Economy, The Review of Economics and Statistics, The European Economic Review, The Journal of Development Economics, Economic Development and Cultural Change, and The Economics of Transition. His areas of expertise include financial and capital markets, labor markets, urban economics, demography and development economics, including the economic transition in the post-communist countries of Central and Eastern Europe. Professor Filer has twice been a Fulbright Scholar in the Czech Republic as well as a visiting scholar at the Institute of Economics, Zagreb, Croatia.

Professor Filer is a member of Prague Society for International Cooperation. Founded during the anti-communist movement, the Prague Society is one of the oldest NGOs in the Czech Republic. It pursues former Members of the Communist Era Secret Police (StB, Stasi, Służba Bezpieczeństwa, ÁVO, Securitate and others), fights corruption and helps to develop a new generation of responsible leaders in Central and Eastern Europe.

References

External links 
 Biography at Hunter College
 Economists Online, publications list
 IDEAS/RePEc page

1952 births
21st-century American economists
Princeton University alumni
Living people